Lizette Salas (born July 17, 1989) is an American professional golfer currently playing on the LPGA Tour.

Early life and education
Born and raised in Azusa, California, Salas graduated from Azusa High School in 2007 and went on to play college golf at the University of Southern California, where she graduated in 2011 with a degree in sociology. She was the first member of her immediate family to earn a college degree.

Amateur career
Salas earned a golf scholarship to the University of Southern California. She had three collegiate wins, was named the 2008 Pac-10 Freshman of the Year, was Pac-10 Player of the Year in 2009 and 2010, and Pac-10 All-Conference First Team selection in 2009, 2010, and 2011. She also was an NGCA All-American First Team selection in 2009 and 2011. Salas is the only USC student-athlete to be recognized as an All-American all four years. In July 2010 she made her first appearance in a professional tournament after qualifying for the U.S. Women's Open. She shot 79-77 at the tournament and missed the cut.

Professional career
Salas turned professional in June 2011 upon graduating from the University of Southern California. She competed on the Symetra Tour in 2011, competing in seven tournaments and finishing 45th on the Symetra Tour money list. Also in 2011, she made her first appearance at the U.S. Women's Open as a professional and finished T15. Salas participated in the 2011 LPGA Qualifying School in the fall of 2011, finishing 20th and earning full status on the LPGA Tour for 2012. Salas won her first championship on the LPGA Tour at the 2014 Kingsmill Championship winning by a four-stroke margin.

In 2015, Salas exceeded the $2 million mark in career earnings when she tied for second at the Meijer LPGA Classic. That year she competed for the second time on the U.S. Solheim Cup team. On the tour, she finished sixth on in driving accuracy and 10th in putting average. In 2017, Salas recorded eight top-10 finishes, including a string of four top-five finishes. Her season-best was a T3 finish at the Swinging Skirts LPGA Taiwan Championship. She competed for the third time on the U.S. Solheim Cup team. In 2018, she recorded four top-10 finishes, including runner-up finishes at the Kia Classic and the Indy Women in Tech Championship. In 2019, she placed second in the Women's British Open.

Professional wins (2)

LPGA Tour (2)

LPGA Tour playoff record (0–2)

Results in LPGA majors
Results not in chronological order before 2019.

^ The Evian Championship was added as a major in 2013.

CUT = missed the half-way cut
WD = withdrew
NT = no tournament
T = tied

Summary

Most consecutive cuts made – 16 (2017 ANA – 2020 ANA)
Longest streak of top-10s – 1 (six times)

LPGA Tour career summary

 Official as of 2022 season
* Includes matchplay and other events without a cut.

1 Earnings prior to 2012 are unofficial because Salas was not an LPGA member.

World ranking
Position in Women's World Golf Rankings at the end of each calendar year.

U.S. national team appearances
Professional
Solheim Cup: 2013, 2015 (winners), 2017 (winners), 2019, 2021

Solheim Cup record

References

External links

Profile on Yahoo! Sports
Lizette Salas at the Symetra Tour official site
Lizette Salas Profile at USC Trojans official site

American female golfers
USC Trojans women's golfers
LPGA Tour golfers
Solheim Cup competitors for the United States
Golfers from California
American sportspeople of Mexican descent
People from Azusa, California
1989 births
Living people
20th-century American women
21st-century American women